Richard Clifford Surhoff III (born October 3, 1962) is an American former Major League Baseball (MLB) player. He last played professional baseball in 1989.

Personal
Surhoff is the older brother of former MLB player B. J. Surhoff, the son of former NBA player Dick Surhoff, and uncle of Austin Surhoff, Brian and Colin Moran.

External links

1962 births
Living people
Major League Baseball pitchers
Philadelphia Phillies players
Texas Rangers players
Kinston Indians players
Canton-Akron Indians players
Oklahoma City 89ers players
Iowa Cubs players
Portland Beavers players
Maine Phillies players
Spartanburg Traders players
Peninsula Pilots players
Reading Phillies players
St. Johns River State Vikings baseball players
Sportspeople from the Bronx
Baseball players from New York City